Inagua Airport (also known as Matthew Town Airport)  is an airport in Matthew Town in Inagua in the Bahamas.

Airlines and destinations

References

Airports in the Bahamas
Inagua